James Darling may refer to:

James Darling (publisher) (1797–1862), Scottish bookseller, publisher and bibliographer
James Darling (priest) (1868–1938), Archdeacon of Suffolk
James Andrew Darling (1891–1979), Scottish-born farmer and political figure in Saskatchewan, Canada
James Ralph Darling (1899–1995), English-born educator in Australia
James Darling (American football) (born 1974), American football linebacker
James ffolliott Darling, Irish trooper and naturalist. 
 James Darling (artist) (fl. 2000s), Australian artist, on the board of Ace Open in Adelaide, South Australia